Hilton, Highland may refer to:
Hilton, Inverness
 Hilton of Cadboll (near Tain and Portmahomack), Highland